Jorge L. Contreras is an American legal scholar and attorney who is recognized as a leading global authority on intellectual property law, technical standardization and the law and policy of human genomics.

Early life and education
Contreras was born in Flushing, Queens, New York, and spend his childhood in South Florida and Texas. He attended Rice University in Houston, Texas. At Rice, Contreras held the elected offices of Rice Program Council (RPC) treasurer and Student Association treasurer, and was a member of the Marching Owl Band (MOB). During the summer of 1987 he studied English literature at Gonville & Caius College, Cambridge University. Contreras attended Harvard Law School from 1988 to 1991, where he earned his JD degree and served as an editor of the Harvard Journal of Law & Technology and worked for Professor Laurence Tribe.

Professional titles
Contreras currently holds the rank of Presidential Scholar and Professor of Law at the University of Utah S.J. Quinney College of Law, with an adjunct appointment in the Department of Human Genetics at the University of Utah School of Medicine. He also serves as a Senior Policy Fellow  at American University Washington College of Law. He has held prior academic appointments at American University Washington College of Law (2011-13) and Washington University School of Law (2010-11). For the past two years Contreras has taught a short course on international patent licensing and litigation at the East China University for Political Science and Law in Shanghai (ECUPL) and served as a TILT/TILEC fellow at Tilburg University in the Netherlands during 2018.

Prior to entering academia, Contreras was a partner at the international law firm Wilmer, Cutler, Pickering, Hale and Dorr LLP, where he practiced transactional intellectual property law in Boston, MA, Washington, DC and London, UK. He clerked for Chief Justice Thomas R. Phillips of the Texas Supreme Court during the 1991-92 court term.

Scholarship and writing
Contreras’s research focuses on patent and antitrust law, science policy, and technology standardization and innovation. He has edited eight scholarly books – two of which have been recognized by the UK-based IPKat blog as the “Best Patent Law Book of the Year”, and has published more than 100 academic articles and book chapters. His scholarship has appeared in Science, several Nature journals, Georgetown Law Journal, NYU Law Review, Iowa Law Review  and other top-tier general and specialty law reviews, as well as peer reviewed law and policy journals. He has been quoted in the New York Times, Wall Street Journal, The Economist, Washington Post, Bloomberg and Politico, and has been featured on radio shows produced by NPR, PRI and BBC  Contreras’s writing has been translated into French, Chinese, Japanese and Korean and he has lectured and spoken in more than two dozen countries on six continents.

Patent Pledges 
Contreras was a pioneer in systematically identifying, cataloging  and studying the legal mechanisms by which patent holders voluntarily waive certain rights to enforce their patents for a range of commercial and altruistic reasons (a, b, c ). In 2020, building on this past theoretical work, Contreras helped to create the Open COVID Pledge (d, e ), a voluntary framework for the commitment of intellectual property rights to the Covid-19 response. To date, more than thirty corporations including Microsoft, IBM, Intel, Facebook, Amazon and Uber, together with the NASA Jet Propulsion Laboratory and Sandia National Laboratory, have pledged an estimated 500,000 patents to this cause on a royalty-free basis. He is currently helping to launch a similar project – the Low Carbon Patent Pledge  -- in which companies have pledged several hundred patents to combat global climate change. There is little scientific evidence on whether patent pledges facilitate technology adoption, however, some studies suggest that they accelerate follow-on inventions.

Standardization Policy and Standards Essential Patents

Contreras is a prolific writer in the field of standardization policy and standards-essential patents. He edited the two-volume Cambridge Handbook of Technical Standardization Law, which is a definitive reference work in the field. His work in this area has been cited by the U.S. Federal Trade Commission, the European Commission and courts in the U.S. and Europe, including the decision of the UK High Court (Patents) in Unwired Planet v. Huawei  (2017). From 2017-19, he, together with collaborators Justus Baron, Pierre Larouche and Martin Husovec, was commissioned by the European Commission’s Joint Research Centre (JRC) to conduct a comprehensive study of governance mechanisms  within standards development organizations.

Contreras is known for a range of proposals intended to improve the efficiency, transparency, and fairness of the technical standardization process, particularly as it is affected by patents. These include the collective negotiation of patent royalty rates by participants in the standardization process., the use of the procedural interpleader mechanism to determine aggregate and individual royalty rates, and the establishment of a non-governmental global rate-setting tribunal for the establishment of patent royalty rates. In addition, he has recently explored:

The Genomic Commons

Contreras was among the first scholars to conceptualize the vast collection of publicly-available genomic data that emerged after the Human Genome Project within the theoretical framework of the knowledge commons [, a construct first developed by Elinor Ostrom and Charlotte Hess  and later expanded by Brett Frischmann, Michael Madison and Kathleen Strandburg 

Gene Patents

Contreras’s book The Genome Defense, recounts the untold story of AMP v. Myriad, the ACLU’s unlikely lawsuit that ended gene patenting in America. Based on over a hundred interviews and thousands of pages of court and agency documentation, the book explains this complex case and subject in a manner intended for the general reader. 

On September 16, 2021, The New York Times included The Genome Defense in its list of "11 New Works of Nonfiction to Read This Season".

Government and advisory roles
In June, 2020, Contreras testified before the U.S. Senate Committee on the Judiciary’s Subcommittee on Intellectual Property  regarding issues of patent quality. In addition, he has served as the U.S. government’s expert on international intellectual property licensing in two major international transfer pricing cases, including Amazon.com v. Commissioner  and Coca-Cola Co. v. Commissioner, the latter of which resulted in a $3 billion tax recovery by the government.

Contreras has served on numerous governmental advisory committees and councils, including the National Institutes of Health (NIH) Council of Councils, the National Advisory Council for Human Genome Research, and the Advisory Council of the National Center for the Advancement of Translational Sciences (NCATS). He served as a member of the National Science Foundation’s (NSF) delegation to the international Belmont Forum on earth data governance and currently serves on the Oversight Board of the University of Utah’s Veterans’ Administration Genealogy Project.

In addition to government service, he has advised the National Academies of Science, Engineering and Medicine (NASEM) in various capacities, served on different committees of the American National Standards Institute (ANSI) and the Association of American Law Schools (AALS), sits on the Advisory Board of the American Antitrust Institute, and has served for two decades in the leadership of the American Bar Association’s (ABA) Section of Science and Technology Law, including five years as Co-Chair of the National Conference of Lawyers and Scientists.

Awards and recognition
Contreras has received numerous awards and recognition for his scholarship, including the University of Utah’s Distinguished Researcher Award (2020), the Joseph Rossman Memorial Award from the Patent and Trademark Office Society for the best yearly paper published in the Journal of the Patent and Trademark Office Society (2021-2022), the University of Utah S.J. Quinney College of Law Faculty Scholarship Award (2018-19), the Daniels Fund Leadership in Ethics Education Award (2018), the Institute of Electrical and Electronics Engineers (IEEE) Standards Education Award (2018), the University of Utah S.J. Quinney College of Law Early Career Teaching Award (2015-16) and the Elizabeth Payne Cubberly Faculty Scholarship Award at American University (2014).

References 

American legal scholars
University of Utah faculty
Washington College of Law faculty
Washington University in St. Louis faculty
Rice University alumni
Harvard Law School alumni
Year of birth missing (living people)
Living people